V. N. Shirodkar or Vithal Nagesh Shirodkar (27 April 1899 – 7 March, 1971) was an Indian obstetrician and gynaecologist, hailing from the State of Goa.

Biography
Shirodkar was born in Shiroda, Goa. He belonged to the Kalawantin community (now known as Gomantak Maratha Samaj in Goa). After he graduated from Grant Medical College, he went to United Kingdom and obtained his Fellow of the Royal College of Surgeons in 1931. He was associated with Professor J. Chassar Moir, Victor Lack, J.D.Murdoch and others.

He returned to India and joined J.J.Group of Hospitals in 1935 as Honorary Obstetrician and Gynecologist. He was an inimitable teacher and innovator. His most widely known contribution is Cervical cerclage the "Shirodkar cerclage". His other contributions include operations for prolapse repair, tuboplasty and creation of neovagina. He published widely and took a keen interest in social medicine.

He was member of the Shantilal Shah Committee on Abortions and also established the Family Planning Association of India.

He was honored by the Government of India with Padma Bhushan in 1960 and Padma Vibhushan in 1971.

Shirodkar Cerclage
A Shirodkar cerclage is very similar to the standard cervical cerclage, but the sutures pass through the walls of the cervix so they're not exposed. This type of cerclage is less common and technically more difficult than a McDonald, and is thought (though not proven) to reduce the risk of infection. The Shirodkar procedure sometimes involves a permanent stitch around the cervix which will not be removed and therefore a Caesarean section will be necessary to deliver the baby. The Shirodkar technique was first described by Dr. V. N. Shirodkar in Bombay in 1955. In 1963, Dr. Shirodkar traveled to NYC to perform the procedure at the New York Hospital of Special Surgery; the procedure was successful, and the baby lived to adulthood.

References

 Shirodkar V.N. Contributions to Obstetrics and Gynaecology. London: E & S Livingstone Ltd., 1960.

Goans in science and technology
Indian gynaecologists
Indian obstetricians
Indian surgeons
1899 births
1971 deaths
Recipients of the Padma Bhushan in medicine
Recipients of the Padma Vibhushan in medicine
People from North Goa district
20th-century Indian medical doctors
Medical doctors from Goa
20th-century surgeons